Valentina Panger (born 14 January 1991) is a Slovenian handball player for RK Zagorje and the Slovenian national team.

She participated at the 2016 European Women's Handball Championship.

References

1991 births
Living people
Slovenian female handball players
People from Izola
21st-century Slovenian women